Myrmecridium is a genus of fungi in the class Sordariomycetes. Circumscribed in 2007, it is distinguished from similar fungi by having entirely hyaline (translucent) vegetative hyphae, and widely scattered, pimple-shaped denticles (toothlike projections) on the long hyaline rachis. The generic name derives from a combination of the Ancient Greek word myrmekia, meaning "wart", and the suffix -ridium from Chloridium.

References

External links

Sordariomycetes genera
Sordariomycetes enigmatic taxa